Jacques Robbe (1643–1721) was a French engineer and geographer. He also wrote plays under the pseudonym Barquebois.

Life
Born in Soissons, Robbe was educated as a lawyer. He became royal geographer, publishing a treatise on geography in 1678, which was translated into Turkish by Petros Baronian, the interpreter for the Dutch embassy in Istanbul.

Robbe died in Paris in 1721.

Works
 Methode pour apprendre facilement la geographie: dediée a monseigneur le duc du Mayne, 2 vols., 1678
 (as M. de Barqubois) La rapinière, ou l'interessé: comédie, 1683
 La femme testvë, ou, Le medecin Holandois: comedie, 1686
 Les hazards du jeu de l'hombre, 1700

References

1643 births
1721 deaths
French engineers
French geographers
17th-century French dramatists and playwrights
17th-century French male writers